Pegmatite Point is a distinctively banded point which juts into the head of Ross Ice Shelf from the Duncan Mountains. The point is 7 nautical miles (13 km) east-northeast of Mount Fairweather. It was first roughly plotted from ground surveys and aerial photographs by the Byrd Antarctic Expedition, 1928–30. The Southern Party of the New Zealand Geological Survey Antarctic Expedition (NZGSAE), 1963–64, visited the point and gave the name because of the abundance of the rock Pegmatite.

Headlands of the Ross Dependency
Amundsen Coast